CLG Cúchulainn, also known as Cúchulainn's are a Gaelic football club from Mullagh, County Cavan in Ireland. They are affiliated to Cavan GAA.

History

1970's
From the inception of the club, on Thursday 18 December 1969, CLG Cuchulainn made its presence felt in Division 1 of the Cavan senior league and senior championship. In the first round of the 1970 Cavan senior championship, Cuchulainns beat Cornafean after a replay. The club's participation in its initial championship came to an end when beaten by Baileborough on a score line of 0–9 to 0–8 at the quarter final stage of the championship in Breffni Park, on Sunday 30 August 1970.

In May 1971 Cuchulainns met the vastly more experienced Crosserlough in the 1970 league final. Incidentally Crosserlough were on their way to winning a record breaking seven in a row senior championship. The Anglo Celt reports that Crosserlough gave clear notice that they were still a force in Cavan football, when they won yet another Cavan title, this time the 1970 league, when beating Cuchulainns by 2–12 to 2–8 in an entertaining match at Breifne Park on Sunday last.

The 1970s ended with the club relegated to intermediate status as a number of the older players retired. On the playing field then, it was a decade of unfulfilled promise and disappointment, but by no means failure.

1980s
If the 1970s saw a gradual decline in the playing fortunes of the club, the 1980s have seen a gradual improvement as the successful juveniles came through to adult level. Cuchulainns did have a good championship run in 1980 when they overcame the challenge of Killygarry after a replay to reach the intermediate championship final. Like the drawn match, the replay was a very close encounter and the possibility of extra time loomed until Aidan Connell snatched a point in the dying moments of the game. The match itself was fast and exiting, but both sets of forwards found scores hard to come by. The final score was 0–10 to 1–6. The final was to be another disappointing day for Cuchulainns, with their opponents Munterconnaught gaining their first intermediate championship title. The Anglo Celt reports that both teams played with resolute determination in a tough exciting match, the final score being 2–4 to 0–7. Munterconnaught the more balanced outfit settled quickly. Cuchulainns relying heavily on Ray Carolan found it harder to get into their stride and it was indeed the second half before they really got into the game. However, with M. Hetherton and O. Stanley in commanding form in midfield, Munterconnaught laid the foundations for victory. In 1983 the club reached its lowest ebb when relegated to Division 3

In 1985 Cuchulainns gained promotion to division 2 and contested both the league and intermediate championship finals. The intermediate championship final was reached by beating literally the best teams in the competition. One only has to remember the thrilling games against Kildallan, Denn and Killeshandra. Gowna, the opponents in the final, proved once again to be the bogey team. Cuchulainns fought hard to get into this game but with Gowna dominating midfield there was to be no joy for the large group of supporters from the parish.

The league final against Kildallan in Mullahoran was yet another disappointing day for Cuchulainns. The game started at break neck speed with Cuchulainns dominating the opening twenty minutes. However, an abundance of scoring chances were missed and slowly Kildallan came back into the match scoring two goals from virtually their only two attacks of the first half. The goals proved to be the turning point of the game with Kildallan going on to dominate the second half, and ran out worthy winners.

The disappointment suffered in 1985 served as a powerful motivator in 1986. The intermediate team firmly established itself in Division 2 of the football league only narrowly missing promotion to Division 1. They also reached the intermediate championship final only to be defeated by the narrowest of margins – one point. The junior team gained the club's first trophy of note by defeating Kildallan in the final of the 1985 Division 3A league which incidentally was not played until October 1986.

The intermediate championship competition threw up many strong sides and with only seven teams in the draw, games were obviously going to be keen. Cuchullainns went in as clear favourites against Drung in the first round but were somewhat lucky to just get home by three points. They entered the semi-finals against a strong and experienced Redhills side and won by 2–5 to 1–5 with two-second half goals settling the issue, scored by P. Carolan and J. Farrelly respectively. The final brought together Cuchulainns beaten finalists in 1985 and the side they accounted for in the semi-final of the same competition, Killeshandra.

Sadly for Cuchulainns it was to be a familiar story with Killeshandra winning the title by 0–10 to 1–6 in a hard-fought final. It was a clash of two very determined teams and it was an occasion when Killeshandra with a well organised defence made the most of their attacking opportunities.

Cuchulainns with the benefit of the breeze in the first half enjoyed a greater share of the play but found themselves trailing by 0–4 to 0–2 at the interval. At this stage the Cuchulainns midfield had the upper hand. However, the tactic of lobbing in some high centres into the Killeshandra square proved fruitless and a great deal of good possession was wasted. As the game entered the third quarter Killeshandra gradually took control, having built up a commanding six-point lead. Cuchulainns responded with a goal and a point from R.Carolan. However, time was running out they could only get within a point of the opposition.

The year 1987 is going to stand out in the history of the club. It was the year that Cuchulainns won the Cavan Intermediate Football Championship and in fact were unbeaten until 6 September 1987. The inclusion of young players produced a winning brand of football. Since some minors were also senior and junior panels, all the panels trained together. Indeed, it was a sight to behold to see 36 or 38 players heading off round the field in Cross. The hard training and large turnouts were rewarded with eight consecutive wins in the league and with a confident air Cuchulainns approached the first round of the intermediate championship against Redhills. However, Cuchulainns were lucky to survive a late rally before eventually winning by a slender one point, 0–16 to 3–6. Cuchulainns forced their way into the semi-final by defeating Kill 0–11 to 1–3 in a disappointing game in Cootehill. In the semi-final Cuchulainns scored an emphatic 4–9 to 0–5 victory over Lavey. The tie ceased to be a contest after the opening 11 minutes when Cuchulainns led by 3–2 to 0–0. In the final Cuchulainns met favourites for the title, Denn. The game itself was described by both local newspapers The Anglo Celt and The Cavan Leader, as the most competitive decider at the Breifne Park venue in years and said both teams were to be complimented on turning in a very enjoyable hour's football. The teams were so evenly matched a draw seemed on the cards from the early minutes. The reason however why the title went to Cuchulainns rather than Denn, was that the winners made the most of their scoring opportunities.

1993 Intermediate Title Goes to Cuchulainns

One of the best performances on the club scene in Cavan in '93 was Cuchulainn's defeat of Lacken in the Cavan Intermediate Football Championship final played in Breffni Park last September. The score line of 3–11 to 1–4 tells its own story, as the East Cavan side were much too good for a young and inexperienced Lacken side on the day.

2000 Seven A side Title

The county board included in the millennium celebrations a "7 A side club" run off competition. Cuchulainns entered a team for play in Ballyhaise. The competition was to be on one Saturday in May. The Cuchulainn lads were surprised to win their section and advance to the finals. The finals were played that same day in the evening in Terry Coyle Park, Cavan. The Cuchulainns football team were crowned County 7 A side champions.

2004 Division 2 League Title

Losing out, after a replay, in the IFC semi-final to the champions-elect would have knocked the stuffing out of most teams. But not Cuchulainns. With great gusto, the Cross-Mullagh lads bounced back to win the ACFL Division Two title less than eight weeks later. Cuchulainns set their stall out from the very early part of the year with a 0–13 to 0–6 win over Lavey at Edwin Carolan Park, putting down a marker for the rest of the season. Come the end of July it became increasingly obvious that Cuchulainns were the team to beat in the league in 2004. The champions-elect showed their consistency and their pedigree with a well merited win over would-be IFC finalists Drung at the Bunnoe venue. Both sides played fast and open football in a match played in excellent playing conditions.

That assuredness was manifest too in the decisive 1–13 to 1–6 victory over would-be IFC kingpins Lacken Celtic. Victory over the Celtics underlined Cuchulainns’ potential and growing stature among their peers. By the end of October, the feeling in Cross-Mullagh was that their favourites could only throw away a place in the last four of the competition. And while they arguably drew the short straw in being pitted against Ballinagh in the semi-final of the league, nobody in any part of the county of Cavan was in doubt but that Cuchulainns had the grit and the toughness to give as good as they would get from the Saffrons, and a little more back besides.

There was no sense of cockiness in the Cuchulainns camp though. It did not matter that the team had amassed 22 points from thirteen league games, losing just two matches out of thirteen into the bargain, including a shock reverse to Cornafean. In a titanic struggle played in Lavey at the end of November, Cuchulainns beat the Saffrons by 1–14 to 1–8. The victory was sweet, well-deserved. Indeed, it probably saw Cuchulainns at their very best in 2004. In capturing their first bit of silverware in eleven years, Cuchulainns were made to fight all the way to the finishing post. Indeed, it took a late, late point to actually decide the issue in Cuchulainns’ favour. Not since 1993 when they captured the Cavan Intermediate Football Championship had Cuchulainns tasted success at senior level. So the win was a joy to behold for all belonging to the club.

2005 Intermediate Championship

Cuchulainns captured the Cavan Intermediate football championship title for the third time in the club's history when they accounted for Drumalee in the final at Kingspan Breffni Park – Cuchulainns 1–6 Drumalee 0–7. This final which many expected to be an open game proved to be a nervous tense affair with the deciding score coming in the nineteenth minute of the second-half when minor star Adrian Taite was on the end of a great move to slot home the team's decisive score. Cuchulainns, who had to change colours from their traditional white with blue trim for this meeting and who are playing their league football in Division 1, showed their experience when for the most of the first half they were under pressure from a lively Drumalee side.

2014 Senior Championship

Cuchulainns progressed to the Semi-final stages of the Cavan Senior Championship for the first time in their history in 2014. Cuchulainns began their Senior Championship Campaign by beating the County Champions Ballinagh in Kingspan Breffni Park in a highly entertaining game on a scoreline of 1:16 to 15. Cuchulainns were then beaten by the eventual Champions Cavan Gaels in the next game which set up a game against Gowna for a place in the Quarter final stages of the competition. Cuchulainns dominated this game in every area of the pitch running out winners on a scoreline of 0:16 to 0:9 points. In the Quarter finals Cuchulainns accounted for Killygarry, in a tense, nervous encounter. Both teams were guilty of wayward shooting in the first half with Cuchulainns coming off slightly better than their opponents, leading by 0:4 to 0:1 at halftime. The Second half began at a ferocious pace, Killygarry fought back to draw the game at 9 points a piece until Cuchulainns kicked the final 2 points of the game which sealed their long-awaited berth into the Semi-final Stages. In the Semi-finals Cuchulainns were drawn against Cavan gaels for the second time in the Championship. Cuchulainns put on a fantastic defensive display in the first half and were very unlucky to go into the half time break losing by 0:6 to 0:3. The Second half proved a step to far for Cuchulainns with the eventual Champions Cavan Gaels grabbing 2 goals to end Cuchulainns Championship for 2014. Cuchulainns Centre half back Seamus Clarke was Nominated for Cavan Senior Club Player of the year after a fantastic Campaign.

Kit
Traditionally Cúchulainn's have worn a white jersey with Blue trims, as well as white shorts and blue socks. They have also worn blue jerseys with white trim such as in the Cavan Intermediate Football Championship final in 2005.

Honours
 Cavan Intermediate Football Championship 3
 1987, 1993, 2005
 Cavan Under-21 Football Championship 2
 1995, 1997 as St Killian's (Cúchulainns/Killinkere)
 2011, 2013 as Assan Gaels (Cúchulainns/Killinkere/Lavey)
 Cavan Minor Football Championship: 1
 1996 as St Killian's (Cúchulainns/Killinkere)

See also
Cavan Senior Football Championship

References

External links
Cuchulainn's Official Website
Official Cavan GAA Website
Cavan Club GAA

Gaelic games clubs in County Cavan
Gaelic football clubs in County Cavan